The Joshua Roll is a Byzantine illuminated manuscript of highly unusual format, probably of the 10th century Macedonian Renaissance, believed to have been created by artists of the imperial workshops in Constantinople, and now in the Vatican Library.

Form and content
The Roll is in the form of a continuous horizontal scroll or rotulus, common in Chinese art but unique in surviving examples of medieval Christian art. It is made of several joined pieces of sheep vellum, is 31 cm high and about 10 metres long, and may be incomplete, as it starts with Chapter II and ends with Chapter X. The Roll covers the early part of the Old Testament Book of Joshua using a reduced version of the Septuagint text; it includes Joshua's main military successes, ending with conquered kings paying him homage.  At roughly this time, the Byzantine empire was enjoying military success in its campaigns in the Holy Land. It was originally painted in grisaille, by several artists, with partial coloring added later in a separate stage. The lettering is in majuscule and minuscule forms.

Style
Like the Paris Psalter, with which it is usually discussed, it is heavily classicising in style, though the extent to which this represents a revival or copying from a much earlier model is the subject of much debate.  Its origins have been much debated by art historians, and the roll is considered to be "one of the most important and difficult problems of Byzantine art." The roll itself is usually acknowledged to be of the 10th century AD, but the images are felt by most art historians to derive from one or more earlier works, perhaps going back as far as Late Antiquity. The subject produced a sharp disagreement between Kurt Weitzmann, who thought the form of the roll was a classicising invention of the Macedonian Renaissance, and Meyer Schapiro, who, whilst agreeing with Weitzmann on a 10th-century date, held to the more traditional view that painted rotuli existed in Late Antiquity, and that the roll was essentially copied from such a work, perhaps through intermediaries.

The images are clearly closely related to later manuscripts of the Octateuch or first eight books of the Old Testament, but where and when the compositions for the cycle originated is controversial.

Steven Wander, professor at the University of Connecticut, claims the images are slanted at ten degrees, in a continuous frieze along the ten meters of the roll.  He suggests this may be because the roll was a copy of the actual preparatory sketches or working drawings for a real column, possibly to scale, like the Ottonian bronze Easter column made for the bishop Bernward of Hildesheim, the Bernward Column in St Michael's Church.

See also
 Castelseprio – Frescoes in a related style
 Leo Bible
 Macedonian Renaissance
 Utrecht Psalter

Citations

General and cited references
 Walther, Ingo F. and Norbert Wolf. Codices Illustres: The world's most famous illuminated manuscripts, 400 to 1600. Köln, TASCHEN, 2005

Further reading
Wander, Steven H. The Joshua Roll. Wiesbaden: Reichert Verlag, 2012,

External links
 Full digital facsimile of the manuscript on the site of the Vatican Library
 " Professor re-examines mysterious document"
 The glory of Byzantium: Art and Culture of the Middle Byzantine Era, A.D. 843–1261, an exhibition catalog from The Metropolitan Museum of Art (fully available online as PDF), which contains material on the Joshua Roll (cat. no. 162)

10th-century biblical manuscripts
10th-century illuminated manuscripts
Book of Joshua
Byzantine literature
Byzantine illuminated manuscripts
Christian illuminated manuscripts
Septuagint manuscripts
Manuscripts of the Vatican Library